Below is a sortable list of compositions by Camille Saint-Saëns.  The works are categorised by genre, opus number, Ratner catalogue number, date of composition and titles. R numbers are from Camille Saint-Saëns 1835–1921: A Thematic Catalogue of His Complete Works by Sabina Teller Ratner (Oxford University Press).

References

 
Saint-Saëns